Cristiano dos Santos Neves (born October 25, 1981 in Rosário do Catete), sometimes known as just Cristiano, is a Brazilian striker. He currently plays for Morrinhos.

Honours
Paraná State League: 2006

Contract
Goiás (Loan) 1 August 2007 to 31 December 2007
J.Malucelli 9 January 2007 to 1 September 2010

External links
 CBF
 sambafoot
 Guardian Stats Centre
 zerozero.pt
  goiasesporteclube.com

1981 births
Living people
Brazilian footballers
Sport Club Corinthians Alagoano players
Ceará Sporting Club players
Associação Desportiva Confiança players
J. Malucelli Futebol players
Paraná Clube players
Sociedade Esportiva Palmeiras players
Goiás Esporte Clube players
Esporte Clube Bahia players
Association football forwards